Mark Lowell Ordesky (born April 22, 1963) is an American film producer, television producer and studio executive. He is best known for executive producing the Oscar winning The Lord of the Rings film trilogy.

Career

New Line Cinema
During 20 years at New Line Cinema (and prior to that Republic Pictures), Ordesky acquired or executive produced over 60 films, including New Line's first Best Picture Oscar nominee (Shine), its first major category Oscar winner (Geoffrey Rush, Academy Award for Best Actor, Shine), and its first Palme d'Or at the Cannes Film Festival (Lars von Trier's Dancer In The Dark).

The Lord of the Rings trilogy
While at New Line, Ordesky executive produced the entire The Lord of the Rings film trilogy. The final film of the trilogy, The Lord of the Rings: The Return of the King, made history by winning every Oscar for which it was nominated, including the Academy Award for Best Picture and Academy Award for Best Director. Collectively, the trilogy earned 17 Oscars from a total of 30 nominations, including three Best Picture nominations.

Fine Line Features
For Fine Line Features (a specialty films division of New Line), Ordesky acquired acclaimed films such as Once Were Warriors, Saving Grace, Trick, State and Main, and Ripley's Game, as well as award contenders Shine, Dancer In The Dark, Before Night Falls, Tumbleweeds, The Sweet Hereafter and American Splendor. Eight Oscar nominations and two Golden Globe nominations in total. Ordesky was Fine Line's president from 1998 to 2005.

Jackie Chan
In 1996, Ordesky helped introduce U.S. audiences to Jackie Chan with the break-out hit Rumble in the Bronx.

Court Five
Ordesky is a founding partner with former New Line Cinema executive Jane Fleming of Court Five, a media company focused on developing and converting intellectual property and brands into filmed entertainment for distribution worldwide.

Personal life
Ordesky was born in Sacramento County, California. In 1985, he graduated from the USC Annenberg School for Communication with a degree in print journalism. He was editor of the university newspaper, the Daily Trojan, and joined the Chi Phi Fraternity. In 2008, he was honored with Chi Phi's Walter Cronkite Congressional Award.

Ordesky supports the American Cinematheque as a board member and is also a member of the Academy of Motion Picture Arts and Sciences, Producers Guild of America, and Academy of Television Arts & Sciences.

In 2004, he married Rachel O'Connell of Wellington, New Zealand.

Filmography
FILM

PRODUCER
 Critters 3 (1991): Associate producer
 Critters 4 (1991): Associate producer
 Sunset Grill (1993): Executive producer
 The Hidden II (1994): Executive producer
 Mother Night (film) (1996): Executive producer
 Mr. Nice Guy (1997): Production Executive
 Pecker (1998): Executive producer
 Roseanna's Grave (1998): Executive producer
 State and Main (2000): Co-producer
 The Lord of the Rings: The Fellowship of the Ring (2001): Executive producer
 Ripley's Game (2002): Executive producer
 The Lord of the Rings: The Two Towers (2002): Executive producer
 The Lord of the Rings: The Return of the King (2003): Executive producer
 The Sleeping Dictionary (2003): Executive producer
 A Dirty Shame (2004): Executive producer
 Birth (2004): Executive producer
 The New World (2005): Executive producer
 The Texas Chainsaw Massacre: The Beginning (2006): Executive producer
 The Golden Compass (2007): Executive producer
 Inkheart (2008): Executive producer
 Paris Connections (2010): Executive Producer
 The Long, Slow Death Of A Twenty Something (2011): Co-Executive Producer
 Tiger Eyes (film) (2012): Producer
 Lovely Molly (2012): Producer
 The Frozen Ground (2013): Producer
 Exists (film) (2014): Producer
 The Murders Of Brandywine Theater (2014): Executive Producer
 Reality High (2017): Producer

TELEVISION
 The Quest (2014 TV series): Executive Producer

MISCELLANEOUS CREW
 Poison Ivy: The New Seduction (1997): Special thanks
 Man of the Century (1999): Thanks
 The Anniversary Party (2001): Special Thanks
 Searching For Angela Shelton (2004): Very Special Thanks

SECOND UNIT DIRECTING
 The Long and Short of It (2003): Second unit director

References

External links
 
 American Cinematheque
 Court Five
 Chi Phi Fraternity
 Jewish Journal: Lord of the Oscars
 Ordesky in Deadline Hollywood
 Ordesky in Variety

1963 births
Film producers from California
Living people
People from Sacramento County, California
USC Annenberg School for Communication and Journalism alumni
20th-century American Jews
21st-century American Jews